Veeram may refer to:

 Veeram (2014 film), an Indian Tamil action film
 Veeram (2016 film), an Indian historical epic, released in Malayalam, Hindi, and English